Singrauli Assembly constituency is one of the 230 Vidhan Sabha (Legislative Assembly) constituencies of Madhya Pradesh state in central India.

It is part of Singrauli District.

See also
Singrauli

References

Assembly constituencies of Madhya Pradesh